The West Side of Manhattan refers to the side of Manhattan Island which abuts the Hudson River and faces the U.S. state of New Jersey. Fifth Avenue, Central Park, and lower Broadway separate it from the East Side. The major neighborhoods on the West Side are (from north to south) Inwood, Hudson Heights, Washington Heights, West Harlem, Morningside Heights, Manhattan Valley, Upper West Side, Hell's Kitchen, Chelsea, West Village, SoHo, and Tribeca. The 8th Avenue and West Side subway lines connect all parts of the West Side. 

The main north-south roads servicing the West Side are the Henry Hudson Parkway in the north, and the West Side Highway in the south. The Hudson River Greenway separates those highways from the western shore of the island.

Redevelopment 
The Far West Side would have been the location of West Side Stadium, which was intended as the Olympic stadium for the New York City bid for the 2012 Summer Olympics. After the rejection of the $2 billion stadium plan that would also lure the New York Jets to Manhattan, developers made plans, including the Hudson Yards Redevelopment Project, to redevelop the West Side with a mix of commercial and residential buildings.

See also
 East Side (Manhattan)
 West Side Story

Neighborhoods in Manhattan